Curtis Stewart (born November 26, 1983), better known by his stage name Kidd Kidd (formerly known as Nutt Da Kidd), is an American rapper from New Orleans, Louisiana. He was one of the first members of Lil Wayne's label imprint, Young Money Entertainment, as a part of Southern hip hop group Sqad Up. In 2011, Kidd Kidd signed a record deal with 50 Cent's label imprint G-Unit Records and subsequently in 2014, he joined the newly reformed East Coast hip hop group, G-Unit. In 2015, he was chosen as part of XXL Magazine's annual Freshman Class.

Career
Kidd Kidd was discovered by American hip hop recording artist Lil Wayne, while rapping on a street corner in New Orleans. Kidd Kidd went on to sign a recording contract with Wayne's record label imprint, Young Money Entertainment. He joined the label as a member of Southern hip hop group Sqad Up, alongside fellow New Orleans-based rappers, Gudda Gudda and T-Streets. The group would ultimately disband and leave Young Money in 2004, due to disputes between members. Kidd Kidd would later rejoin the label and make an appearance on Lil Wayne's 2008 hit single "Mrs. Officer", however after not appearing in the video, Kidd Kidd severed ties with Wayne once again.

In June 2011, two weeks after meeting New York City-based rapper 50 Cent, Kidd Kidd was shot six times. In July 2011, it was announced Kidd Kidd secured a recording contract with 50 Cent's G-Unit Records. 50 Cent empathized with Kidd Kidd's situation, reminiscent to his own shooting in 2000, and instead of walking away much like Columbia Records did to him, 50 Cent chose to help Kidd Kidd. He has gone on to appear on numerous 50 Cent's projects, such as The Big 10 (2011), The Lost Tape (2012) and 5 (Murder by Numbers) (2012). After being prominently featured on 50 Cent's fifth album Animal Ambition, which was released in June 2014, Kidd Kidd was added to the East Coast hip hop group named G-Unit.

On April 11, 2018, Kidd Kidd announced that he had left G-Unit Records to focus on his own label RLLNR Entertainment

The brand RLLNR (Reallionaire) is more like a lifestyle and movement, rather than just a record label. He mentions being in an environment, that was hostile and full of people with hidden agendas. It's rare to find people that are real, and true to themselves. 

Since leaving G-Unit Records, Kidd Kidd has since then released several mixtapes and features.

Personal life
On June 12, 2011, Kidd Kidd was attacked and shot six times while sitting in a vehicle, outside his mothers home in New Orleans.  Two masked men ambushed the car he was sitting in, firing 36 shots into the vehicle. In June 2019 he married a woman named Shayla from Ocala, Florida

Discography

Extended plays

Mixtapes

Singles

As a lead artist

As a featured artist

Guest appearances

References

External links

 
 
 
 

American rappers
Living people
American shooting survivors
African-American male rappers
G-Unit Records artists
Rappers from New Orleans
Southern hip hop musicians
Gangsta rappers
G-Unit members
1983 births
21st-century American rappers